Office de la poste guinéenne or OPG is the company responsible for postal service in Guinea.

Communications in Guinea
Companies of Guinea
Guinea